The Chicago Bluesmen were an American professional roller hockey team based at the Fox Valley Ice Arena in Geneva, Illinois, that played in Roller Hockey International. The team was coached by Eric Schneider.

References

 
Geneva, Illinois
Roller Hockey International teams
Sports clubs established in 1999
Sports clubs disestablished in 1999
Sports in Kane County, Illinois